Karvansara (also Romanized as Kārvānsarā and Kārevānserā) is a Kurdish village in Beygom Qaleh Rural District, in the Central District of Naqadeh County, West Azerbaijan Province, Iran. At the 2006 census, its population was 741, in 187 families.

References 

Populated places in Naqadeh County